In finance, time value is:

 Time value of money; or
 Time value of an option.

In transport economics, time value refers to:

 Value of time

In photography and cameras TVs, time value refers to:

  in the APEX system (Additive System of Photographic Exposure)
 Time value mode (Tv mode), a shutter priority mode on electronically controlled cameras